Lufwanyama is a small town on the M18 Road in the Copperbelt Province of Zambia.

Location
The town lies in Lufwanyama District in the Copperbelt Province, in northwestern Zambia, close to the International border with the Democratic Republic of the Congo.

Overview
Despite being only , by road, southwest of the most urban and industrialised part of the country, the mining cities of the Copperbelt, Lufwanyama is underdeveloped and lacks infrastructure such as electricity, all-weather roads and hospitals. Zambia National Commercial Bank, the largest financial services provider in the country, by assets, maintains a branch in the town.

Points of interest
The following points of interest lie within the town or close to its edges:
 The headquarters of Lufwanyama District Administration
 The offices of Lufwanyama Town Council
 A branch of Zambia National Commercial Bank, the largest commercial bank in Zambia, based on assets.

See also
 Copperbelt Province
 Ndola

References

Populated places in Copperbelt Province